Aureliano Blanquet (31 December 1849 – 7 April 1919) was a general of the Federal Army during the Mexican Revolution. He was a key participant  in the coup d'état during the Ten Tragic Days. One historian has identified Blanquet as "one of the major villains of the Mexican Revolution".

Biography

Early career
Blanquet was born in 1849 in Morelia, Michoacán. At 18 he joined the Republican forces besieging the city of Queretaro where the last of Emperor Maximilian's Imperial troops had been trapped. After the surrender Blanquet served as a member of the firing squad which executed Maximilian and two of his generals: Miguel Miramón and Tomás Mejía.

In 1877 Blanquet enlisted in the regular Federal Army. Under Porfirio Diaz he made steady but unspectacular advancement. While holding the rank of captain he was involved in the suppression of a Maya rising in Yucatan during the 1890s.

During the Mexican Revolution
In July 1911 Blanquet commanded federal troops stationed in Puebla. On July 12 a group of armed men fired shots at the rival Maderistas and fled into the federal army barracks. The incident erupted into an all-out battle in which Blanquet defeated the Maderistas. 46 were killed, including women and children. On the next day Madero publicly hugged Blanquet and cleared him of any wrongdoing; he ordered radical Maderistas to surrender arms to Blanquet's Federales and go home. The Puebla Incident also created international tension after the fleeing Maderistas killed German and Spanish expatriates who stood in their way.

During May 1912 Blanquet served under General Victoriano Huerta, leading the 29th Infantry Battalion in the successful suppression of the Orozquista revolt against the Madero government.

In June 1913, General Huerta dismissed General Mondragon as Secretary of War, and replaced him with Blanquet. Now promoted to the rank of General of Division, Blanquet was also appointed to hold the position of Minister of Marine (i.e. Navy).

In October 1913 Huerta dissolved the Federal Congress and prepared for a rigged referendum to legitimize himself as the President, with Blanquet named as vice-president.

In July 1914, when the Huerta government collapsed, Blanquet resigned as vice president, and departed from Mexico with Huerta.

On August 19, 1914, General Blanquet, having returned from overseas, intervened in the disbandment process of Huerta's defeated Federal army. He led the 29th Battalion of 400 men, which he had formerly commanded, plus other remnants of Federal troops dissatisfied with their redundancy payments, against Carrancistas in Puebla. Blanquet captured the city and learned that two Carrancistas agents, brothers Ramon and Raphael Cabrera, were on their way to Puebla to assert the authority of the new government. Blanquet's federals captured the Cabreras and shot them on Blanquet's order. The two surviving Cabrera brothers, Luiz and Alfonso, avenged the dead with a campaign of terror, killing over sixty Federal prisoners. Blanquet escaped and resumed his exile, in Cuba.

Death
In March 1919, Blanquet returned from exile in Cuba, to support the Félix Díaz rebellion against Venustiano Carranza.  With only about six followers he moved inland from the Gulf Coast in an attempt to join up with Diaz.  On April 7, 1919, Blanquet was killed when his horse fell down a ravine after a skirmish with government troops near La Barranca de Chavaxtla, Veracruz. The Constitutionalist commander General Guadalupe Sánchez had Blanquet's head taken to Veracruz for display and photographing.

Notes

References
 Henderson, Peter (2000). In the absence of Don Porfirio: Francisco León de la Barra and the Mexican Revolution. Rowman & Littlefield. .
 LaFrance, David (2007). Revolution in Mexico's Heartland: Politics, War, and State Building in Puebla, 1913-1920. Rowman & Littlefield. .

1849 births
1919 deaths
Mexican generals
People from Morelia
Military personnel from Michoacán
People of the Mexican Revolution
Mexican military personnel killed in action
Mexican people of French descent